Leonid Sharayev (12 April 1935 – 13 December 2021) was a Soviet-Ukrainian politician. A member of the Communist Party, he served as First Secretary of the Mykolaiv Oblast Committee of the Communist Party of Ukraine from 1980 to 1990.

References

1935 births
2021 deaths
Communist Party of Ukraine (Soviet Union) politicians
People from Kherson Oblast